Rómulo Méndez Molina (21 December 1938 – 6 January 2022) was a Guatemalan football referee. He was the first Guatemalan referee ever to participate in World Cup finals, refereeing one match in the 1982 World Cup and one match in the 1986 edition. Méndez was born in Cobán on 21 December 1938. He died on 6 January 2022, at the age of 83.

References

External links 
 Profile at worldfootball.net

1938 births
2022 deaths
People from Cobán
Guatemalan football referees
FIFA World Cup referees
1982 FIFA World Cup referees
1986 FIFA World Cup referees